Criminal Procedure Act (with its variations) is a stock short title used for legislation relating to criminal procedure in Hong Kong, Malaysia, New Zealand, the Republic of Ireland, South Africa and the United Kingdom.

The Bill for an Act with this short title may have been known as a Criminal Procedure Bill during its passage through Parliament.

Criminal Procedure Acts may be a generic name either for legislation bearing that short title or for all legislation which relates to criminal procedure.

List

Hong Kong
 The Criminal Procedure Ordinance 1899

Malaysia
The Criminal Procedure Code

New Zealand
The Criminal Procedure Act 2011
The Criminal Procedure (Mentally Impaired Persons) Act 2003

Republic of Ireland
The Criminal Procedure Act 2010
The Criminal Procedure (Amendment) Act 2007
The Criminal Procedure Act, 1993
The Criminal Procedure (Amendment) Act, 1973
The Criminal Procedure Act, 1967

South Africa
The Criminal Procedure and Evidence Act, 1917 (No 31)
The Criminal Procedure and Evidence Act, 1917, Amendment Act 1927 (No 7)
The Criminal Procedure and Jurors Amendment Act 1954 (No 21)
The Criminal Procedure and Evidence Amendment Act 1955 (No 29)
The Criminal Procedure Act, 1955 (No 56)
The Criminal Procedure Amendment Act, 1958 (No 9)
The Criminal Procedure Amendment Act, 1963 (No 92)
The Criminal Procedure Amendment Act, 1965 (No 96)
The Criminal Procedure Amendment Act, 1968 (No 9)
The Criminal Procedure Act, 1977 (No 51)
The Criminal Procedure Matters Amendment Act, 1978
The Criminal Procedure Amendment Act, 1979
The Criminal Procedure Amendment Act, 1982
The Criminal Procedure Matters Amendment Act, 1984
The Criminal Procedure Amendment Act, 1986
The Criminal Procedure Amendment Act, 1987
The Law of Evidence and the Criminal Procedure Act Amendment Act, 1987
The Criminal Procedure Amendment Act, 1989
The Criminal Law and the Criminal Procedure Act Amendment Act, 1989
The Criminal Procedure Amendment Act, 1991
The Criminal Procedure Second Amendment Act, 1995
The Criminal Procedure Amendment Act, 1996
The Criminal Procedure Second Amendment Act, 1996
The Criminal Procedure Amendment Act, 1997
The Criminal Procedure Second Amendment Act, 1997
The Criminal Procedure Amendment Act, 2001
The Criminal Procedure Second Amendment Act, 2001
The Criminal Procedure Amendment Act, 2003
The Criminal Procedure Amendment Act, 2008

United Kingdom
Applying to two or more of the three jurisdictions (England and Wales, Scotland, Ireland to 1922; E+W,S,NI after)
The Criminal Procedure and Investigations Act 1996 (c. 25) 
The Criminal Procedure (Attendance of Witnesses) Act 1965 (c. 69) 
The Criminal Procedure Act 1865 (28 & 29 Vict c 18) or Denman's Act 
The Criminal Procedure Act 1851 (14 & 15 Vict c 100)
The Criminal Procedure Act 1848 (11 & 12 Vict c 46)

England and Wales
The Criminal Procedure (Insanity and Unfitness to Plead) Act 1991 (c. 25) 
The Criminal Procedure (Insanity) Act 1964 (c. 84) - also applies to Courts Martial elsewhere
The Criminal Procedure (Right Of Reply) Act 1964 (c. 34)
The Criminal Procedure Act 1853 (c. 30)

Scotland
The Criminal Procedure (Legal Assistance, Detention and Appeals) (Scotland) Act 2010 (asp 15)
The Criminal Procedure (Amendment) (Scotland) Act 2004 (asp 5)
The Criminal Procedure (Amendment) (Scotland) Act 2002 (asp 4) 
The Criminal Procedure (Intermediate Diets) (Scotland) Act 1998 (c. 10)
The Criminal Procedure (Scotland) Act 1995 (c. 46)  
The Criminal Procedure (Consequential Provisions) (Scotland) Act 1995 (c. 40)
The Criminal Procedure (Scotland) Act 1975 (c. 21)
The Criminal Procedure (Scotland) Act 1887 (c. 35) (repealed 1.4.1996)
The Criminal Procedure Act 1701 (c. 6)

Northern Ireland
The Criminal Procedure (Majority Verdicts) Act (Northern Ireland) 1971 (c. 37) (N.I.)

See also
List of short titles

References
Charles W H Lansdown and E F Van der Riet, assisted by G N Dock. Judicial Interpretations of the South African Criminal Procedure Acts, 1917-1955. Juta & Co Ltd. Cape Town. 1956.
J Kane. Handbook of Amended Criminal Procedure Acts. Wallachs. Pretoria. 1935.

Lists of legislation by short title
Criminal law of the United Kingdom